The 1962 Montana Grizzlies football team represented the University of Montana in the 1962 NCAA University Division football season. The independent Grizzlies were led by fifth-year head coach Ray Jenkins, played their home games at Dornblaser Field, and finished the season with a record of five wins and five losses (5–5).

The Skyline Conference had dissolved in the summer and was succeeded by the new Western Athletic Conference (WAC); Montana was an independent this season and a charter member of the Big Sky Conference in 1963.

Schedule

References

Montana
Montana Grizzlies football seasons
Montana Grizzlies football